Pegasus 2 or Pegasus II, known before launch as Pegasus B was an American satellite which was launched in 1965 to study micrometeoroid impacts in Low Earth orbit. It was the second of three Pegasus satellites to be launched, following the launch of Pegasus 1 three months earlier. The Pegasus spacecraft were manufactured by Fairchild Hiller, and operated by NASA.

Spacecraft

Launch

Pegasus 2 was launched atop a Saturn I rocket, serial number SA-8, flying from Launch Complex 37B at the Cape Kennedy Air Force Station. The launch occurred at 07:35:01 UTC on 25 May 1965. Following launch, Pegasus 2 was given the COSPAR designation 1965-039A, whilst NORAD assigned it the Satellite Catalog Number 01381.

Pegasus 2 was a secondary payload on the carrier rocket, which was carrying a boilerplate Apollo spacecraft, Apollo 104 or BP-26, as part of a series of configuration tests for the Apollo program. The Apollo boilerplate acted as a payload fairing for the Pegasus spacecraft, which was stored inside what would have been the Service Module of a functional spacecraft. Upon reaching orbit, the boilerplate Command and Service modules were jettisoned. Boilerplate separation occurred 806 seconds after liftoff, with Pegasus 2's detectors being deployed one minute later. The predicted orbital lifetime of Pegasus 2 was 1220 days.

Operations
Pegasus 2 was operated in a low Earth orbit. Once in orbit, the panels were deployed to detect micrometeoroid impacts. Experiment results were returned to Earth by radio. The spacecraft operated until 29 August 1968, and subsequently remained in orbit until it decayed and reentered the atmosphere on 3 November 1979.

See also

1965 in spaceflight

References

Spacecraft launched in 1965
Spacecraft launched by Saturn rockets